Arthur Cunliffe (5 February 1909 – 28 August 1986) was an English professional footballer who played as a winger. In 1932 he was awarded two caps for the England national football team.

His cousin was Jimmy Cunliffe, also a footballer.

References

External links
Football League player database 
Arthur Cunliffe England stats at thefa.com

1909 births
1986 deaths
English footballers
England international footballers
Association football forwards
Blackburn Rovers F.C. players
Aston Villa F.C. players
Middlesbrough F.C. players
Burnley F.C. players
Hull City A.F.C. players
Rochdale A.F.C. players
Stoke City F.C. wartime guest players
English Football League players